"Dreamin'" is the debut single by the American dance-pop band Will to Power, released in 1987 off their self-titled debut album. The dance song reached No. 50 on the Billboard Hot 100 and No. 15 on the dance chart in the United States. Many different versions were recorded, including an extended version and a "Manhattan Mix".

Background vocals are performed by two of the original members of Expose’, Alejandra (Ale’) Lorenzo and Laurie Miller.

Track listings

 US 12" single

Charts

References

1987 songs
1987 debut singles
Will to Power (band) songs
Epic Records singles